In set theory, several ways have been proposed to construct the natural numbers. These include the representation via von Neumann ordinals, commonly employed in axiomatic set theory, and a system based on equinumerosity that was proposed by Gottlob Frege and by Bertrand Russell.

Definition as von Neumann ordinals 

In this way  for each natural number n. This definition has the property that n is a set with n elements. The first few numbers defined this way are: 

The structure  is a model of the Peano axioms . The existence of the set N is equivalent to the axiom of infinity in ZF set theory.

The set N and its elements, when constructed this way, are an initial part of the von Neumann ordinals. Ravven and Quine refer to these sets as "counter sets".

Frege and Russell 

Gottlob Frege and Bertrand Russell each proposed defining a natural number n as the collection of all sets with n elements. More formally, a natural number is an equivalence class of finite sets under the equivalence relation of equinumerosity. This definition may appear circular, but it is not, because equinumerosity can be defined in alternate ways, for instance by saying that two sets are equinumerous if they can be put into one-to-one correspondence—this is sometimes known as Hume's principle.

This definition works in type theory, and in set theories that grew out of type theory, such as New Foundations and related systems. However, it does not work in the axiomatic set theory ZFC nor in certain related systems, because in such systems the equivalence classes under equinumerosity are proper classes rather than sets.

For enabling natural numbers to form a set, equinumerous classes are replaced by special sets, named  cardinal. The simplest way to introduce cardinals is to add a primitive notion, Card(), and an axiom of cardinality to ZF set theory (without axiom of choice). 

Axiom of cardinality:  The sets A and B are equinumerous if and only if Card(A) = Card(B)

Definition: the sum of cardinals K and L such as  K= Card(A) and L = Card(B) where the sets A and B are disjoint, is Card (A ∪ B).

The definition of a finite set is given independently of natural numbers:

Definition : A set is finite if and only if any non empty family of its subsets has a minimal element for the inclusion order. 

Definition: a cardinal n is a natural number if and only if there exists a finite set of which the cardinal is n.

0 = Card (∅) 

1 = Card({A}) = Card({∅})

Definition: the successor of a cardinal K is the cardinal K + 1

Theorem: the natural numbers satisfy Peano’s axioms

Hatcher 

William S. Hatcher (1982) derives Peano's axioms from several foundational systems, including ZFC and category theory, and from the system of Frege's Grundgesetze der Arithmetik using modern notation and natural deduction. The Russell paradox proved this system inconsistent, but George Boolos (1998) and David J. Anderson and Edward Zalta (2004) show how to repair it.

See also 

 Ackermann coding
 Foundations of mathematics
 New Foundations

References 

 Anderson, D. J., and Edward Zalta, 2004, "Frege, Boolos, and Logical Objects," Journal of Philosophical Logic 33: 1–26.
 George Boolos, 1998. Logic, Logic, and Logic.
 
 Abraham Fraenkel, 1968 (1953). Abstrast Set Theory. North Holland, Amsterdam, 4th edtition.
 Hatcher, William S., 1982. The Logical Foundations of Mathematics. Pergamon. In this text, S refers to the Peano axioms.
 Holmes, Randall, 1998.  Elementary Set Theory with a Universal Set. Academia-Bruylant. The publisher has graciously consented to permit diffusion of this introduction to NFU via the web. Copyright is reserved.
 Patrick Suppes, 1972 (1960). Axiomatic Set Theory. Dover.

Citations

External links 

 Stanford Encyclopedia of Philosophy:
 Quine's New Foundations — by Thomas Forster.
 Alternative axiomatic set theories — by Randall Holmes.
 McGuire, Gary, "What are the Natural Numbers?"
 Randall Holmes:  New Foundations Home Page.

Basic concepts in infinite set theory